Darius LaVar Miles (born October 9, 1981) is a former American professional basketball player.

The ,  forward was selected directly out of high school by the Los Angeles Clippers with the third overall pick in the 2000 NBA draft.  He was a First Team NBA All-Rookie in 2001, a first for a prep-to-pro player.

Miles' playing career nearly came to an end when he was released by the Portland Trail Blazers in April 2008 after two years away from the court following microfracture surgery on his right knee. He returned to action during the 2008–09 season as a member of the Memphis Grizzlies.

Early years
Miles was born in Belleville, Illinois and attended East St. Louis Lincoln High School and East St. Louis Senior High School in East St. Louis, Illinois.  Before declaring to enter the 2000 NBA Draft, Miles had signed a National Letter of Intent to play for the St. John's Red Storm men's basketball team, alongside fellow top recruit Omar Cook.  Mike Jarvis, the head coach for the Red Storm at the time, has stated that Miles' commitment significantly helped obtain Cook and the other incoming freshmen from the recruiting class.

Professional career

Los Angeles Clippers (2000–2002) 
Miles entered the 2000 NBA draft and was selected by the Los Angeles Clippers as the third overall pick, at the time the highest a player had been drafted directly from high school. For the next two seasons Miles, Quentin Richardson, Corey Maggette, Lamar Odom and Elton Brand entertained fans with their exciting, high flying style of play. He played his first two seasons with the Clippers, earning an NBA All-Rookie Team first team honor in 2001. In those years Miles, Richardson, and others helped the Clippers improve their performance from 15 wins in 99-00, to 31 wins in 00-01 to finally 39 wins in 01-02. In the 2001–02 season, the Clippers appeared to be on the verge of their first playoff appearance since 1997; however, they were only able to win three of the last 12 games of the season, ultimately finishing five games out of the playoffs.

Cleveland Cavaliers (2002–2004) 
Following the 2001–2002 season, Miles was traded to the Cleveland Cavaliers, alongside Harold Jamison, in a deal for Andre Miller and Bryant Stith where he spent a season and a half before being traded to the Portland Trail Blazers for Jeff McInnis and Ruben Boumtje-Boumtje midway through the 2003–04 season.

Portland Trail Blazers (2004–2008) 
During the 2004–05 season, Miles made headlines after a confrontation with then-coach Maurice Cheeks in which Miles reportedly insulted Cheeks with racial slurs and remarked he "did not care if the team were to lose the next 20 games" since Cheeks was "going to be fired anyway".  According to ESPN's Chad Ford and other accounts, after Cheeks asked Miles to leave, Miles' response was "Make me." When Cheeks left the room to see Blazers' general manager John Nash, Miles ran behind him shouting, "That's right, run to your daddy."
On April 19, 2005, he scored a career-high 47 points in a loss against the Denver Nuggets, which equalled the eighth-highest single-game output in franchise history.

Late in the 2005–2006 season, Miles severely injured his right knee. Five days later, on April 15, 2006, he played in his 40th and last game of the season. He missed the entire 2006–07 and 2007–08 NBA seasons due to microfracture surgery to repair his injury.

In an effort to shed Miles's $18 million contract, the Portland Trail Blazers petitioned the NBA and the NBA Players Association in March 2008 to provide an independent doctor to decide whether Miles could play again. The examination determined that Miles' knee injury was severe enough to be career-ending, prompting the Blazers to request waivers for his release on April 14, 2008. However, Miles had the option to sign on with another team if offered a contract, potentially reverting the $18 million savings the Blazers hoped to gain if Miles played in 10 games in 2008.

Complicating matters was a 10-game suspension for violating the league's substance abuse policy levied by the NBA, which Miles was required to serve before he could play for any NBA team.

Memphis Grizzlies (2008–2009) 
On August 22, 2008, the Celtics signed Miles to a non-guaranteed contract offering him a chance to earn a roster spot at training camp. Though he worked out twice with the team and impressed with his health and attitude, he was waived on October 20, before the regular season started.

On December 13, 2008, Miles signed with the Memphis Grizzlies. After sitting out his ten-game suspension, Miles made his season debut with the team on January 4, 2009, playing the last 1:46 in a 102–82 win against the Dallas Mavericks. On January 7, after collecting only two rebounds and two blocks in nine minutes over two games, Miles was waived. On January 9, following a controversy over his re-signing, the Grizzlies signed Miles to a 10-day contract. The next game, against the Cavaliers on January 14, Miles played 14 minutes and exhibited some of the quickness and leaping ability he once possessed. He recorded 13 points on 4 of 6 shooting and making 5 of 7 free throws in a 102–87 loss. On January 30, 2009 the Grizzlies signed Miles for the rest of the 2008–09 season.

On July 9, 2009, the Grizzlies renounced their rights on Miles in order to save cap room.

Career-ending injury controversy
Under NBA rules, if a team is granted salary-cap relief for a career-ending injury to a player who thereafter participates in at least ten games the next season, the salary cap relief is terminated and the amount is added back to the team's salary cap ceiling.

On January 8, 2009, after Miles played six pre-season games with the Celtics and two before being released from a non-guaranteed contract by the Grizzlies, the Portland Trail Blazers threatened to sue any of the other 29 NBA teams that picked up Miles and played him specifically to adversely impact their salary cap and tax positions. In response, the NBA players' association threatened to file a grievance against the Trail Blazers. After a directive from the NBA Commissioner's office the next day declaring that any team could sign Miles and the League would approve the contract, the Memphis Grizzlies re-signed Miles on January 10, 2009 to a 10-day non-guaranteed contract.  Miles then played the two games necessary to trigger re-addition of the $18 million to Portland's cap amount. Miles then re-signed two more 10-day contracts with the Grizzlies before being signed for the rest of the 2008–09 season on January 30, 2009.

Miles' final NBA game was played on April 13, 2009 in a 110 - 119 loss to the Phoenix Suns in which he recorded two points, two rebounds and an assist in six and one-half minutes of playing time.

Acting career
Miles had a role in The Perfect Score (2004), as a high school basketball star who needs to achieve a qualifying SAT score to attend St. John's University, closely paralleling his real-life situation coming out of high school. He also appeared in National Lampoon's Van Wilder (2002), along with then-Clipper teammates Michael Olowokandi and Quentin Richardson. He also appeared in a documentary titled The Youngest Guns (2004), which detailed Miles' and Richardson's first few years in the NBA.

NBA career statistics

Regular season 

|-
| align="left" | 
| align="left" | L.A. Clippers
| 81 || 21 || 26.3 || .505 || .053 || .521 || 5.9 || 1.2 || .6 || 1.5 || 9.4
|-
| align="left" | 
| align="left" | L.A. Clippers
| 82 || 6 || 27.2 || .481 || .158 || .620 || 5.5 || 2.2 || .9 || 1.3 || 9.5
|-
| align="left" | 
| align="left" | Cleveland
| 67 || 62 || 30.0 || .410 || .000 || .594 || 5.4 || 2.6 || 1.0 || 1.0 || 9.2
|-
| align="left" | 
| align="left" | Cleveland
| 37 || 16 || 24.0 || .432 || .167 || .542 || 4.5 || 2.2 || .7 || .7 || 8.9
|-
| align="left" | 
| align="left" | Portland
| 42 || 40 || 28.4 || .526 || .200 || .702 || 4.6 || 2.0 || 1.0 || .8 || 12.6
|-
| align="left" | 
| align="left" | Portland
| 63 || 22 || 27.0 || .482 || .348 || .600 || 4.7 || 2.0 || 1.2 || 1.2 || 12.8
|-
| align="left" | 
| align="left" | Portland
| 40 || 23 || 32.2 || .461 || .200 || .534 || 4.6 || 1.8 || 1.1 || 1.0 || 14.0
|-
| align="left" | 
| align="left" | Memphis
| 34 || 0 || 8.8 || .485 || .167 || .742 || 1.7 || .5 || .3 || .6 || 3.5
|- class="sortbottom"
| style="text-align:center;" colspan="2"| Career
| 446 || 190 || 26.3 || .472 || .168 || .590 || 4.9 || 1.9 || .9 || 1.1 || 10.1

Personal life
On August 3, 2011, Miles was arrested in Lambert-St. Louis International Airport for carrying a loaded gun.
After making nearly $62 million in his NBA career, Miles filed for bankruptcy on September 18, 2016. In October 2018, Miles addressed mental health issues that he had battled after his career in a Player's Tribune article.

Since February 2019 he has co-hosted The Knuckleheads podcast with Quentin Richardson associated with The Players' Tribune. On the podcast, Miles and Richardson interview former and current professional basketball players from the perspective of ex-NBA players.

References

External links

1981 births
Living people
African-American basketball players
American men's basketball players
Basketball players from Illinois
Cleveland Cavaliers players
Doping cases in basketball
Los Angeles Clippers draft picks
Los Angeles Clippers players
McDonald's High School All-Americans
Memphis Grizzlies players
National Basketball Association high school draftees
Parade High School All-Americans (boys' basketball)
Portland Trail Blazers players
Small forwards
Sportspeople from Belleville, Illinois
21st-century African-American sportspeople
20th-century African-American people